John Gorrie (1803–1855) was an American physician, scientist, inventor, and humanitarian.

John Gorrie may also refer to:

 John Gorrie (director) (born 1932), British television director
 Sir John Gorrie (judge) (1829–1892), British colonial judge and diplomat
 John Gorrie (elder) (born 1950), Kurnai Elder of East Gippsland, Victoria, Australia

See also